Welsh Rowing (formally known as the Welsh Amateur Rowing Association)  is the governing body for the sport of rowing in Wales. It is responsible for promoting the sport in Wales, choosing crews to send to the Home Countries International Regatta and the Commonwealth Rowing Championships as well as progressing talented Welsh rowers along relevant pathways into the Great Britain trials and squads. It has 21 affiliated clubs, including schools and universities.

Welsh Rowing is based at the Sport Wales National Centre, and boats its athletes from the Channel View Leisure Centre, Grangetown Cardiff.  Welsh Rowing host a British Rowing Start Centre, with two coaches, and aims to raise the awareness and participation of rowing within Wales. As well as river rowing and indoor rowing, Welsh Rowing works closely with the Welsh Sea Rowing Welsh Sea Rowing Association, which is the national association for coastal and ocean rowing clubs in Wales.

Affiliated clubs
Aberystwyth University Boat Club
Bangor University Rowing Club
Cardiff Bay Recreational Rowing Club
Cardiff and Vale Schools Rowing Academy
Cardiff City Rowing Club
Cardiff Metropolitan University Boat Club
Cardiff University Rowing Club 
Cardiff University Rowing Club Alumni
Carmarthen Boat Club
City of Swansea Rowing Club
Clwb Antur Dyffryn Peris
Fishguard and Goodwick Jemima Rowing Club
Haberdashers' Monmouth School for Girls Rowing Club
Llandaff Rowing Club
Monmouth Comprehensive School Boat Club
Monmouth Rowing Club
Monmouth School Rowing Club
Old Monmothians Rowing Club
Penarth Rowing Club
Swansea University Rowing Club
University of South Wales Rowing Club

World Class Start Centre
The Welsh Rowing World Class Start Centre is supported by British Rowing and is the only centre of its kind in Wales. To be considered for the World Class Start Centre promising athletes must meet the criteria (females must be  or taller and aged between 14 and 22, and males  or taller and aged between 14 and 20).

The current rowers within the Welsh Rowing World Class Start Centre are:

 Angharad Broughton
 Shereen Miers
 Ben Pritchard
 Andy Wallis

Welsh and GB Representation
Over the years there have been many Welsh Athletes who have represented GB.

The current GB Senior Welsh Athletes are:

 Alice Baatz 
 Tom Barras 
 Josh Bugajski 
 Beccy Girling 
 Gemma Hall 
 Zak Lee-Green 
 Ben Pritchard 
 Graeme Thomas 
 Vicky Thornley 
 Oliver Wynne-Griffith

See also
Welsh Sea Rowing Association

References

External links
Welsh Rowing
Welsh Rowing Facebook
Welsh Rowing Twitter
Welsh Sea Rowing Association

Rowing in Wales
Rowing governing bodies
Rowing
Amateur sport in the United Kingdom